Koodappirappu is a 1956 Malayalam film produced by Rasheed and directed by J. D. Thottan under the banner of Kadeeja Production. The story was written by Muthukulam Raghavan Pillai. This was the debut for both Vayalar Rama Varma and to actress, Sukumari Nair.

Cast 
 Prem Navas
 T. S. Muthaiah
 Muthukulam Raghavan Pillai
 Ambika
 Miss Kumari
 Kumari Thankam
Adoor Pankajam

Soundtrack
There are 11 songs in this film, 10 songs were written by Vayalar Rama Varma and 1 song was by Swathi Thirunal, named Alarsharaparithaapam. Songs were composed by K. Raghavan and sung by  A. M. Rajah, Santha P. Nair, M. L. Vasanthakumari and K. Raghavan.

References

External links 
 
 OLD MALAYALAM CINEMA SONGS

1956 films
1950s Malayalam-language films
Films directed by J. D. Thottan
Indian black-and-white films